The 2000 Australian Open was a tennis tournament played on outdoor hard courts at Melbourne Park in Melbourne in Australia. It was the 88th edition of the Australian Open and was held from 17 through 30 January 2000.

Seeds
Champion seeds are indicated in bold text while text in italics indicates the round in which those seeds were eliminated.

Draw

Finals

Top half

Section 1

Section 2

Bottom half

Section 3

Section 4

References

External links
 2000 Australian Open – Men's draws and results at the International Tennis Federation

Men's Doubles
Australian Open (tennis) by year – Men's doubles